The 1987 Pan American Games, officially known as the X Pan American Games, was a major international multi-sport event held in Indianapolis, Indiana, United States, on August 7–23, 1987. Over 4,300 athletes from 38 countries in the Americas competed in 30 sports, earning 1,015 medals. Events were held at 23 venues in and around Indianapolis. The official mascot for the games was Amigo, a green parrot.

Host city selection

Santiago, Chile, was originally named the host of the tenth Pan American Games, but it withdrew in 1983 due to political and financial problems. Quito, Ecuador, was named to replace Santiago, but it also withdrew, in late 1984. Desperate, the Pan American Sports Organization (PASO) held a new election. Indianapolis was planning to bid on the 1991 Games, but, at the request of the United States Olympic Committee, submitted a bid for 1987. Since many sports facilities were already in place, PASO announced on December 18, 1984, that Indianapolis would be the host. Havana, Cuba, was also interested, but PASO appeased Fidel Castro, who had threatened to boycott the games, by agreeing to give Havana the 1991 games provided that Cuba participated at Indianapolis.

Organization 
The city of Indianapolis created an organizing committee called Pan American Ten/Indianapolis (PAX/I). It had eighteen operating divisions, 300 paid staff, and 37,000 volunteers.

Symbols 

The logo of the 1987 Pan Am Games consisted of five stylized X's, the Roman numeral for ten. Designed by Michael Hayes of the JMH Corporation in Indianapolis, the seven colors represented the wildlife and flags of western hemisphere countries. The mascot was Amigo, a green parrot, designed by Jerry Reynolds of Perennial Pictures in Indianapolis. He represented friendliness and festivity. The official music of the X Pan American Games was Pan American Fanfare by Lalo Schifrin.

Broadcasting rights 
The rights for the 1987 games were won by CBS with a bid of $4,000,000, and Brent Musburger hosted. CBS aired 26 hours of coverage, all on weekend afternoons, including live coverage of the Opening Ceremony from the Indianapolis Motor Speedway. Additionally, CBS provided the world feed. Because these games were first since the Cuban Revolution in which Cuban athletes were competing in the United States, the ratings were boosted by their participation, providing a United States-Cuba showdown in many events.

Venues
The 1987 Pan Am Games were held at a total of 23 sites. The athletes village, which provided lodging and dining for the athletes, was located at Fort Benjamin Harrison.

 Brown County State Park – biking
 Bush Stadium – baseball
 Eagle Creek Park – archery, canoeing, rowing
 Circle Theatre – weightlifting
 Hinkle Fieldhouse – volleyball
 Hoosier Dome – closing ceremonies, gymnastics, handball
 Hoosier Horse Park - equestrian events
 Indiana Convention Center – boxing
 Indiana University Natatorium – diving, swimming, synchronized swimming
 IU Michael A. Carroll Track & Soccer Stadium – athletics
 Indianapolis Motor Speedway – opening ceremonies, speed roller skating, cycling
 Indianapolis Tennis Center – tennis
 Kuntz Memorial Soccer Stadium – soccer
 Lake Michigan (Michigan City, Indiana) – yachting
 Major Taylor Velodrome – cycling
 Market Square Arena – basketball

Games

Opening ceremony 

The opening ceremony was held on the main straight of the Indianapolis Motor Speedway, the site of the Indianapolis 500. Crowd size reports range from 69,518, the official capacity of the stadium proper, to 80,000. The show, The Magic that is America, was produced by The Walt Disney Company at a cost of several million dollars. The 6,500 performers made it the largest outdoor live entertainment show held in the United States up to that date. It was also the largest opening ceremony of the Pan Am games to that time.

Sandi Patty was a featured singer and the show included hot air balloons and military fighter jets. Dignitaries included IOC President Juan Antonio Samaranch, Indianapolis Mayor William H. Hudnut III, Indiana Governor Robert D. Orr, and PASO President Mario Vazquez Raña.

U.S. Vice President George H. W. Bush officially opened the games, and additional security protocols for his presence led to about 5000 people being delayed in lines, with twelve people fainting.

Flag bearers in the Parade of Nations included the games' oldest athlete, 70-year-old yachtsman Durward Knowles of the Bahamas, basketball star José Ortiz of Puerto Rico, and baseball pitcher Jim Abbott of the United States. The Canadian delegation engaged with the crowd by playing frisbee with them. The final leg of the torch relay had the flame passed from Indianapolis-born basketball player Oscar Robertson to gymnast Kristie Phillips to sprinter Wilma Rudolph, also from Indianapolis, who lit the cauldron.

During the opening ceremony, a plane chartered by anti-Castro Cuban-American activists flew a banner urging Cuban athletes to defect.

Events
 Thirty sports were contested at the tenth Pan American Games for a total of 321 events. Five were contested for the first time in 1987, including handball.

  Archery
  Athletics
  Baseball
  Basketball
  Boxing
  Canoeing
  Cycling
  Diving
  Equestrian
  Fencing
  Field hockey
  Figure skating
  Football (soccer)
  Gymnastics
  Handball
  Judo
  Modern Pentathlon
  Roller skating
  Rowing
  Sailing
  Shooting
  Softball
  Swimming
  Synchronized swimming
  Table tennis
  Taekwondo
  Tennis
  Volleyball
  Water polo
  Weightlifting
  Wrestling

Participating nations
38 nations participated in the tenth Pan American Games. Four countries competed for the first time in 1987: Aruba, British Virgin Islands, Cayman Islands, and Grenada.

  (28)
  (377)
  (45)
  (50)
  (85)
  (43)
  (72)
  (28)
  (410)
  
  (631)
 
  (105)
  (260)
 
  (535)
  (135)
  (60)
  (93)
  (7)
  (92)
  (17)
  (4)
 
  (108)
  (353)
  (92)
  (40)
  (100)
  (65)
  (110)
  (341)
 
  (80)
  (743)
 
  (107)
  (210)

Protests involving the Cuban delegation during the games 
Tension between Cuba and the United States had already been an issue with the selection of Indianapolis over Havana for the site of the games, and a Cuban boycott had been avoided only when Fidel Castro received a promise that the 1991 Pan American Games would be held in Havana. After the incident with a plane flying a banner urging Cuban athletes to defect in the opening ceremony, Cuban immigrants to the United States continued to use the games as a way to confront the Castro regime, using the Cuban athletes as a proxy. This games marked the first time since the Cuban Revolution that Cuban athletes had participated in the United States. At a baseball game in Bush Stadium between Cuba and the Netherlands Antilles the day after the opening ceremony, Cuban-American protestors taunted the Cuban players, threw flyers at them, and mocked them with offers of cash. A fight broke out, but only one bystander was injured and hospitalized after Indianapolis police broke up the fight by preventing the Cuban players from entering the stands. At a subsequent game against Puerto Rico, some Cuban players were able to enter the stands to chase protestors before being stopped.

During boxing events at the Indiana Convention Center, anti-Castro Cuban-American protestors mocked the Cuban boxers from the stands. The police were unable to stop the Cuban boxers from entering the stands and punching the protestors in retaliation. According to witnesses, up to a dozen Cuban boxers, including Pablo Romero, as well as a hundred spectators were involved. Two people were hospitalized. After these incidents Manuel Gonzalez Guerra, who was Cuba's top sports official, publicly demanded that organizers keep the anti-Castro protestors away from the Cuban athletes. In private, he also unsuccessfully asked the Indianapolis police chief to lock the activists up. Mark Miles, the president of the organizing committee, made a phone call to the Ronald Reagan administration in the White House, who subsequently pressed Cuban-American activists groups to dial down the pressure by the final week.

Medal count

To sort this table by nation, total medal count, or any other column, click on the  icon next to the column title.

Notes
 The medal counts for the United States and Canada differ in various sources.

Indianapolis Museum of Art exhibition 
Coinciding with the Pan American Games was the Indianapolis Museum of Art exhibition Art of the Fantastic: Latin America, 1920–1987. The exhibition presented 125 works by artists from a variety of nations, including Argentina, Brazil, Chile, Colombia, Cuba, Mexico, Nicaragua, Peru, Puerto Rico, the United States, Uruguay, and Venezuela. Well-known artists such as Frida Kahlo and Roberto Matta were featured, as well as artists who had never exhibited outside their native country. The show was the first large-scale presentation of 20th-century Latin American art in the U.S. in over 20 years and was the museum's first contemporary exhibition to travel.

Closing ceremony 

The closing ceremony took place in the Hoosier Dome. The headline act was Cuban American Gloria Estefan and her band, Miami Sound Machine. The choice of Castro-critic Estefan, who had fled with her family during the Cuban Revolution while her father stayed and was imprisoned, led the Cuban delegation to again threaten to boycott.

The organization committee defended the decision, saying that the band was hired because her latest album, Let It Loose, released two months before the games, had been certified platinum because of its sales. In the end, the Cuban delegation's protest was merely not to dance during her performance.

Aftermath

The Pan Am Games brought about $175 million (1988 USD, $355.1 million 2016 USD) to Indianapolis's economy. Hosting the Games cost about $30 million. Indianapolis was the first Pan American Games host city to break even financially.

Hosting the games also attracted many sports organizations to consider Indianapolis as a site for their headquarters, most notably the National Collegiate Athletic Association.

Bibliography

References

External links

 Indianapolis 1987 - X Pan American Games - Official Report at PanamSports.org 

 
Pan American Games
Pan American Games
International sports competitions hosted by the United States
Pan American Games
Pan
Pan
Pan
Multi-sport events in the United States
Pan American Games
August 1987 sports events in the United States
1980s in Indianapolis